Mount White-Fraser is a  glaciated mountain located in the Boundary Ranges of British Columbia, Canada. Precipitation runoff from the peak and meltwater from the surrounding Salmon Glacier drains into the Salmon River. The mountain was named by the International Boundary Survey for one of its own members, George White-Fraser (1872-1920), who also served with the Canadian Infantry in France during World War I. The mountain's name was officially adopted March 31, 1924. Weather permitting, the mountain can be seen from the gravel Granduc Mine Road near Hyder, Alaska, which is seasonally open in summer.

Climate

Based on the Köppen climate classification, Mount White-Fraser is located in the marine west coast climate zone of western North America. Most weather fronts originate in the Pacific Ocean, and travel east toward the Coast Mountains where they are forced upward by the range (Orographic lift), causing them to drop their moisture in the form of rain or snowfall. As a result, the Coast Mountains experience high precipitation, especially during the winter months in the form of snowfall. Temperatures can drop below −20 °C with wind chill factors below −30 °C.

See also

Geography of British Columbia

References

External links
 Weather: Mount White-Fraser
 George White-Fraser

Two-thousanders of British Columbia
Pacific Ranges
Cassiar Land District